The Battle of Oposhnya was a battle which took place on February 8, 1709 during the Swedish invasion of Russia in the Great Northern War. After the costly siege of Veprik the Swedes under Charles XII of Sweden started an offensive against the Russian army in the area. The intention of this offensive was not clear to the Russians, as they subsequently had to spread their main forces out to cover possible attack directions. One of these were the troops under Aleksandr Danilovich Menshikov positioned at Oposhnya on the river Vorskla to block any attempt by the Swedes to cross the river. Charles intended to attack Menshikov and his 6,000 cavalry in a surprising manner, forcing them off the location. He led 2,000 cavalry for this task and managed to catch the Russians completely by surprise while having dinner. Charles immediately charged with his men and swept the Russian forces out of the town followed by a hot pursuit on step. In this action the Russians lost more than 450 men, the Swedes only 19. Perhaps more importantly however, the Swedes could now cross the river Vorskla. The offensive continued for a while and Charles reached Krasnokutsk where he forced another Russian army on the run.

References

Conflicts in 1709
1709 in Europe
Oposhnya 1709
Oposhnya
Oposhnya